SGAC may refer to:

 Space Generation Advisory Council, a non-governmental organization which aims to bring the views of students and young space professionals to the United Nations, Space Agencies and other organisations
 Student Global AIDS Campaign, an advocacy group with more than 85 chapters at high schools, colleges, and universities across the United States